Before the Dawn is the second live album by English singer-songwriter Kate Bush, credited to The KT Fellowship. The album was released on 25 November 2016 by Bush's label Fish People, and is distributed in the United States by Concord Records. It was recorded in 2014 during Bush's sell-out 22-date residency, Before the Dawn, at the Hammersmith Apollo in London, which saw her return to the stage following a 35-year absence.

The album has been certified Gold in the UK by the British Phonographic Industry.

Overview 
As with the residency, the album is split into three parts, comprising seven miscellaneous songs, the complete Ninth Wave suite from Hounds of Love, and A Sky of Honey from Bush's 2005 release Aerial. Presented in the same order as the original show, the album's performances are culled from various shows throughout the residency.

Before the Dawn contains the song "Tawny Moon", performed by Bush's son, Albert McIntosh. It also contains the track "Never Be Mine", which did not feature on the Before the Dawn residency, but was recorded when the show was performed without an audience for the purposes of filming the production.

Following two years of speculation, the album, released as three-CD and four-record pressings, was officially announced on 29 September 2016; the track "Prologue" was also shared. Bush commented:

The track "Prologue (Live)" was made available for streaming on 28 September, before "King of the Mountain (Live)" was released as a promotional single on 21 October, and "And Dream of Sheep (Live)", along with an accompanying piece of film used during the concerts, was made available as the album's official single on 18 November 2016.

Track listing

All songs written by Kate Bush, except "Astronomer's Call", "Waking the Witch", and "Watching Them Without Her", written with David Mitchell, and "Jig of Life" written with John Carder Bush.

Disc one: Act I

 "Lily" – 4:50
 "Hounds of Love" – 3:29
 "Joanni" – 6:09
 "Top of the City" – 5:13
 "Never Be Mine" – 5:57
 "Running Up That Hill (A Deal with God)" – 5:39
 "King of the Mountain" – 8:08

Disc two: Act II – The Ninth Wave

 "Astronomer's Call" – 2:38
 "And Dream of Sheep" – 3:35
 "Under Ice" – 2:59
 "Waking the Witch" – 6:35
 "Watching Them Without Her" – 2:01
 "Watching You Without Me" – 4:25
 "Little Light" – 2:04
 "Jig of Life" – 4:09
 "Hello Earth" – 8:00
 "The Morning Fog" – 5:19

Disc three: Act III – A Sky of Honey

 "Prelude" – 1:53
 "Prologue" – 10:12
 "An Architect's Dream" – 5:19
 "The Painter's Link" – 1:33
 "Sunset" – 7:59
 "Aerial Tal" – 1:29
 "Somewhere in Between" – 7:01
 "Tawny Moon" – 6:10
 "Nocturn" – 8:48
 "Aerial" – 9:45
 "Among Angels" – 5:50
 "Cloudbusting" – 7:16

Personnel
 Kate Bush – vocals, piano ("The Ninth Wave" pre-recorded, "Prologue", "Among Angels"), pre-recorded synths
 Kevin McAlea – keyboards, Uilleann pipes, accordion
 Jon Carin – keyboards, guitars, programming, vocals
 David Rhodes – guitars
 Friðrik Karlsson – guitars, bouzouki, charango
 John Giblin – bass
 Mino Cinelu – percussion
 Omar Hakim – drums
Speaking parts and chorus
 John Carder Bush – writer and narrator ("Jig of Life")
 Paddy Bush – helicopter pilot ("Waking the Witch"), harmonic vocals, fujare
 Kevin Doyle – astronomer ("Astronomer's Call")
 Jo Servi – witchfinder ("Waking the Witch"), chorus
 Albert McIntosh – Ben ("Watching Them Without Her"), Boy ("Prelude", "The Painter's Link", "Tawny Moon"), chorus
 Bob Harms – dad ("Watching Them Without Her"), chorus
 Jacqui DuBois, Sandra Marvin, chorus
Production
 Kate Bush – writer, producer, mixing
 David Mitchell – co-writer ("Astronomer's Call", "Watching Them Without Her", and the helicopter pilot)
 Nick Skilbeck – chorus MD
 Ben Thompson – puppeteer
 Robert Allsopp – puppet creation
 Chris Lawson – guitar and bass technician
 Morten 'Turbo' Thobro – keyboard (and guitar) technician
 Steve Grey – drums and percussion technician
 Ian Newton – monitor engineer, 'water tank' vocals research and recording
 Baz Tymms – backline technician
 Greg Walsh – FOH engineer, surround systems supervision, 'water tank' vocals research and recording
 Davide Lombardi – FOH engineer
 Davey Williamson – surround systems engineer
 James Drew – soundscape
 Jim Jones and Ian Silvester – studio technician, live show recording
 Stephen W Tayler – live lead vocal engineer, audio post-production sunshine, mixing
 James Guthrie – sound consultant, mastering
 Joel Plante – mastering
 Stuart Crouch Creative - album artwork design
 Timorous Beasties – Two Worlds illustration
 Ruth Rowland – hand lettering
 Tim Walker, Trevor Leighton, Ken McKay, Gavin Bush – photography
 Tim Walker – cover photography
Paul Munro- 'water tank' Vocals Production Sound MIxer

Charts

Weekly charts

Year-end charts

Certifications

References

Kate Bush albums
Albums recorded at the Hammersmith Apollo
EMI Records live albums
Concord Records live albums
2016 live albums